Dongqinggou Township (Mandarin: 东倾沟乡) is a township in Maqên County, Golog Tibetan Autonomous Prefecture, Qinghai, China. In 2010, Dongqinggou Township had a total population of 2,172: 1,124 males and 1,048 females: 677 aged under 14, 1,374 aged between 15 and 65 and 121 aged over 65.

References 

Golog Tibetan Autonomous Prefecture
Township-level divisions of Qinghai